is a railway station on the Iida Line in the town of Iijima, Kamiina District, Nagano Prefecture, Japan, operated by Central Japan Railway Company (JR Central).

Lines
Takatōbara Station is served by the Iida Line and is 150.7 kilometers from the starting point of the line at Toyohashi Station.

Station layout
The station consists of one ground-level side platform serving a single bi-directional track. There is no station building, but only a shelter on the platform. The station is unattended.

Adjacent stations

History
Takatōbara Station opened on 12 December 1918. With the privatization of Japanese National Railways (JNR) on 1 April 1987, the station came under the control of JR Central.

Passenger statistics
In fiscal 2016, the station was used by an average of 30 passengers daily (boarding passengers only).

Surrounding area
The station is located in a rural area surrounded by fields.

See also
 List of railway stations in Japan

References

External links

 Takatōbara Station information 

Railway stations in Nagano Prefecture
Railway stations in Japan opened in 1918
Stations of Central Japan Railway Company
Iida Line
Iijima, Nagano